Guerin or Guérin may refer to:

People

Surname

Actors and dancers
 Bruce Guerin (1919–2012), American child actor
 Florence Guérin (born 1965), French actress
 François Guérin (1927–2003), French actor
 Isabelle Guérin (born 1961), French ballet dancer
 Lucy Guerin (born 1961), Australian dancer and choreographer
 Maude Guérin (born 1965), Canadian film and television actress
 Roger Guérin (1926–2010), French musician and singer
 Theodosia Stirling (1815–1904), known as Mrs. Guerin, Australian actor and singer

Artists
 Charles-François-Prosper Guérin (1875–1939), French post-impressionist painter
 Christophe Guérin (1758–1831), French engraver and painter
 Emmanuel Guérin (1884–1967), French sculptor
 François Guérin (artist) (1717–1801), French miniaturist, draughtsman and artist
 Gabriel-Christophe Guérin (1790-1846), Bavarian painter
 Gilles Guérin (1611–1678), French sculptor
 Jean Michel Prosper Guérin (1838–after 1912), French painter
 Jean-Baptiste Paulin Guérin (1783–1855), French painter
 Jean-Urbain Guérin (1760–1836), French draughtsman and miniaturist
 Jules Guérin (artist) (1866–1946), American painter
 Pierre-Narcisse Guérin (1774–1833), French painter

Doctors and scientists
 Alphonse Guérin (1816–1895), French surgeon
 Camille Guérin (1872–1961), French immunologist
 Félix Édouard Guérin-Méneville (1799–1874), French entomologist
 Victor Guérin (1821–1891), French intellectual, explorer and amateur archaeologist

Journalists
 Didier Guérin (born 1950), Franco-Australian magazine media executive
 Orla Guerin (born 1960), Irish journalist
 Robert Guérin (1876–1952), French journalist and 1st President of FIFA
 Veronica Guerin (1958–1996), Irish journalist

Military figures
 Elsa Jane Forest Guerin (fl. 1860s), American Civil War figure
 Fitz W. Guerin (1846–1903), American photographer and Medal of Honor recipient
 Gabriel Guérin (1892–1918), French pilot in World War I
 Hubert Guerin (1896–1986), French diplomat and military officer

Musicians and composers
 Beb Guérin (1941–1980), French jazz musician
 John Guerin (1939–2004), American drummer
 Mlle Guerin (born c. 1739, fl. 1755), French composer

Political figures and activists
 Bella Guerin (1858–1923), Australian feminist
 Daniel Guérin (1904–1988), French anarchist
 Gertrude Guerin (1917-1998), Canadian first nations chief
 James John Edmund Guerin (1856–1932), Canadian politician
 Jules Guérin (1860–1910), French journalist and anti-semitic activist
 Lionel Guérin (contemporary), French chief executive officer and politician
 Stacey Guerin (contemporary), American politician from Maine
 Thomas I. Guerin (1903–1956), American politician from Pennsylvania
 Yves Guérin-Sérac (born 1926), French anti-communism activist

Religious figures
 Marie-Azélie Guérin (1831–1877), French Roman Catholic saint
 Pierre Guérin de Tencin (1679–1758), French ecclesiastic
 Théodore Guérin (1798–1856), French-American Roman Catholic saint

Sports figures
 Alexis Guérin (cyclist) (born 1992), French cyclist
 Bill Guerin (born 1970), American ice hockey player
 Daniel Guérin (table tennis) (fl. 1935–1936), French table tennis player
 Eric Guerin (1924–1993), American jockey
 Henri Guérin (footballer) (1921–1995), French footballer
 Henri Guérin (fencer) (1905–1967), French fencer
 Jim Guerin (1894–1918), Irish hurler
 Lina Guérin (born 1991), French rugby union player
 Maddy Guerin (born 1999), Australian rules footballer
 Richie Guerin (born 1932), American basketball player
 Paul-André Guérin (born 1997), French footballer
 Victor Guerin (racing driver) (born 1992), Brazilian racing driver
 Vincent Guérin (born 1965), French footballer

Writers, poets, filmmakers
 Eugénie de Guérin (1805–1848), French writer
 Hippolyte Guérin (1797–1861), French poet
 José Luis Guerín (born 1960), Spanish filmmaker
 Léon Guérin (1807–1885), French author and poet
 Maurice de Guérin (1810–1839), French poet
 Mona Guérin (1934–2011), Haitian writer for television and radio
 Paul Guérin (1830–1908), French priest, professor of philosophy, writer and encyclopedist

Other people
 Claudine Guérin de Tencin (1681–1749), French socialite
 Héloïse Guérin (born 1989), French model
 Jacques Guérin-Desjardins (1894–1982), French scouting leader
 Michael Guerin, fictional character in the book Roswell High and television series Roswell
 Napoleon Guerin (fl. 1841), American inventor
 Vera Guerin (born c. 1947), American billionaire and philanthropist

Other names containing Guerin
 Guérin de Montaigu (died 1230), French nobleman
 Guerin of Provence (died 845 or 856), French nobleman
 Guerin Austin (born 1980), American television host, model and beauty queen
 Guerin Spranger (born c. 1610), Dutch Jewish entrepreneur 
 Alice Guerin Crist (1876–1941), Australian poet, author and journalist
 Guyon Guérin de Bouscal (1613–1657), French dramatist and novelist
 Petrus Guérin du Rocher (1731–1792), French Jesuit
 Robert Guérin du Rocher (1736–1792), French Jesuit

Places
 Guérin, Quebec, a township municipality in Canada
 Guérin, Lot-et-Garonne, a commune in the Lot-et-Garonne department, France
 Guérin-Kouka, Dankpen, a city in Togo

Other uses
 Guerin Sportivo, Italian sports magazine

French-language surnames